Benard Kimeli (born 10 September 1995) is a Kenyan long-distance runner. In 2020, he competed in the men's race at the 2020 World Athletics Half Marathon Championships held in Gdynia, Poland.

In 2017, he won the Singelloop Utrecht held in Utrecht, Netherlands. He won the Prague Half Marathon held in Prague, Czech Republic in 2018 and in 2019.

He also finished in 8th place in the 2021 Berlin Marathon.

References

External links 
 

Living people
1995 births
Place of birth missing (living people)
Kenyan male long-distance runners
20th-century Kenyan people
21st-century Kenyan people